Diane Lee Smith-Gander  (born November 1957) is an Australian business executive. In 2017, she received the Governance Institute of Australia President's Award for exceptional service.

Biography 
Smith-Gander grew up in Alfred Cove, a suburb of Perth, Western Australia, and attended Melville Senior High School. She began studying science at the University of Western Australia but after her second year changed to economics. She also holds an MBA from the University of Sydney. She started her career in banking, working in banking operations, technology solutions and change management roles for Westpac. She also worked in the United States and Hong Kong for the international management company McKinsey & Co.

Smith-Gander has held a range of governance positions, including the role of commissioner of Tourism Western Australia, non-executive director of CBH Group, and deputy chair of NBN Co. In 2007 she became a full-time company director.

Smith-Gander is also a professor of corporate governance at the University of Western Australia, and serves on the advisory board of the university's Business School.

In the 2019 Queen's Birthday Honours Smith-Gander was made an Officer of the Order of Australia (AO) in recognition of her "distinguished service to business, to women's engagement in executive roles, to gender equality, and to the community".

References

1957 births
Living people
University of Sydney alumni
University of Western Australia alumni
Academic staff of the University of Western Australia
People from Perth, Western Australia
Officers of the Order of Australia